David Moses Bridges (May 17, 1962 – January 20, 2017) was a Native American environmentalist and artist known for his traditional birchbark canoes and baskets. He was a member of the Passamaquoddy tribal community on the Passamaquoddy Pleasant Point Reservation. Bridges fought for tribal environmental rights and was a co-founder of Mulankeyutmonen Nkihtakmikon, to preserve the Wabanaki culture.

He learned to build canoes from his great-grandfather Sylvester Gabriel and how to make baskets from his female relatives.

Biography and education 
Bridges was born in Portland, Maine, on May 17, 1962, and predominantly grew up with the Sipayik Native Community in South Portland. During the summertime, he spent most of his time with his grandfather Sylvester Gabriel. Bridges' family consisted of his parents, three siblings, and many relatives, most of whom were female. From his female relatives, he learned how to make baskets.

After graduating high school in 1980, Bridges moved to San Francisco, California, where he lived for the next ten years. While living in San Francisco, he worked several jobs that included painting, carpeting, and group home counseling and was able to explore many different types of artwork. He would occasionally return home to work as a camp counselor. When he moved back home, Bridges's grandfather enlightened him on how to build canoes that were stable enough to go through rivers and bays smoothly. Bridges also took classes with Steve Cayard at the WoodenBoat School in Brooklin, Maine, and the two equally created workshops in Native and Anglo communities. He also took jobs at the Benjamin River and Brooklin Boat Yard.

In 1994, Bridges and his partner Jessica Francis moved to Sipayik and decided to start a family. They would go on to have Bridges’ first son: Tobias. Later in life Bridges married his wife Patricia Ayala Rocabado and went on to have two more boys: Sebastian, and Natanis. When his first son was four, Bridges began studying history at the University of Maine at Machias, after which point he moved to Bethel, Maine. Bridges held birch canoe workshops and together with his wife, held presentations at several anthropological, and archaeological conferences in North and South America. He also held presentations at universities and cultural institutions.

When Bridges was 54, he was diagnosed with sinus cancer, which led to his death on January 20, 2017. His most capable eldest son, Tobias, continued his work by joining the canoe project led by Cayard and Patricia, further pursuing her parents' careers in indigenous archaeology. Patricia also began working on an art book and a film on Bridges.

Early life 
David Moses Bridges was born on May 17, 1962. He mainly spent the majority of his childhood in the South of Portland, Maine. Bridges grew up with his father Earl Bridges, mother Hilda Lewis, his great-grandfather, Sylvester Gabriel, brother Darel Bridges and his sister Jennifer Bridges. Bridges' great-grandfather lived with them as a care-taker for him and his siblings.

Growing up, Bridges attended many camps that were related to his tribal community. Bridges fell in love with the camp so much that when he got older he would come home from San Francisco to Portland during the summer to become a camp counselor.

Bridges' great-grandfather introduced Bridges to the birchbark canoe. Due to his great-grandfather's old age, they were not able to create a birchbark canoe together. Bridges' great-grandfather passed away in 1972 when Bridges was 10 years old but he left Bridges with tools such as a crooked knife, draw knife, and an awl.

Ever since then, Bridges had the heart to finish the canoe so he attended school and studied more about the traditions related to his tribal community and about boat making.

Bridges started making birchbark canoes to preserve the dying tradition. Bridges made canoes with his students, who were of all ages. He also went to universities and museums giving presentations about his work.

Artworks

Traditional birchbark canoe 

Bridge’s ancestors started off making the traditional birchbark canoe until his great father’s time. His grandfather gave him the tools and the materials to create a canoe. Bridges was inspired to build the birchbark canoes because he believed that it would help keep the tradition alive in the modern-day and wanted people to thank their ancestors for creating this masterpiece. The traditional birchbark canoe had to be thin so that it was easy to carry after using it. The material needed to create the birchbark canoe was red cedar for thwarts and planking, 
birchbark and spruce roots. Plus a bear fat and spruce sap mix for waterproofing patches. According to Bridges, no special tools were needed except a crooked knife made out of beaver tooth.

Birchbark box 
The birchbark box was made out of birch bark and spruce root. Bridges died before he could complete the box. He did not intend to fully decorate the birchbark box, as he wanted people to see and appreciate the beauty of the bark itself.

"Story Basket" 
Bridges made this basket while experiencing family difficulties and reflects his internal struggles to provide for his family. It features several scenes, one of which is of his pregnant wife and child Sabattus asking for food.  Another features Bridges hunting for moose and carrying a canoe, as well as Tobias alone pulling a sled. Behind all of these scenes, an ancestor is shown watching over the family.

Knife sheath 
Bridges created this knife sheath while working on other artwork. He would often carry his knife around and as he did not want to cut himself on the sharp edge, he created a sheath using birch bark and spruce roots, materials with which he was already working.

Exhibition 
Abbe Museum located in Bar Harbor, Maine

Peabody Essex Museum located in Salem, Massachusetts. September 27, 2014 ~ September 20, 2015

Heard Museum Guild Indian Fair and Market, 2015 

Solo Exhibitions:

Only Connect: Richard vanBuren & David Moses Bridges, Aucocisco Gallery, Portland, Maine. January 15, 2008 ~ March 1, 2008 

Group Exhibitions:

 Wabanaki Antiques Expo, May 9  
 Branching Out: Trees as Art, Peabody Essex Museum, Salem, Massachusetts ~2014
 Maine Indian Basketry Exhibition, at Maine Fiberarts. This exhibition included Pam Cunningham, George Neptune, Clara Keezer, Molly Neptune Parker, Jeremy Frey, Fred Tomah, Mart Sanipass, Thersea Secord, and Sarah Sochbeson. May 5 ~June 30, 2015

Collections 
- Eitelijorg  (Indianapolis, IN)

- Downeast Heritage Museum (Calais, ME)

- Penobscot Marine Museum (Searsport, ME)

- Abbe Museum (Bar Harbor, ME)

- Hudson Museum (Orono, ME)

- Passamaquoddy Cultural Heritage Museum (Indian Township, ME)

- National Museum of the American Indian (New York, NY)

Awards and honors 

 Main Arts Commissions gave him the name Traditional Arts Fellow, highest honor in craft
 1997; Patrick Miranda Foundation
 1998; Patrick Miranda Foundation
 2000; Maine Arts Commission, Master/Apprentice Award
 2004; Maine Boats and Harbors, Boat of the Year Award
 2005; First Peoples Fund, Community Spirit Award
 2006; First People’s Fund gave him its Community Spirit Award, National Honor in recognition of his work
 2007; Jennifer Easton Community Spirit Award honoree
 2007; Fund for Folklife Culture, Professional Development Grant
 2007; First Peoples Fund, Cultural Capitol Fellow
 2008; Artists in Business Leadership Fellow, Cultural Capital Fellow
 2008; Eitelijorg Museum, Artist and Residence Fellowship
 2008; New England Foundation for the Arts
 2014; Santa Fe Indian Market, Honorable Mention
 2015; Heard Museum Indian Fair and Market, Basket Division, First place
 2017; letter of tribute from members of the Senate and House of Representatiave of the State of Maine

Legacy 
After Bridges's death, his wife, Patricia Ayala Rocabado, created an artbook of his works. A documentary on his life, Rhythms of the Heart, was created by Thom Willey and released in August 2017. In 2019, authors Donald Soctomah and Jean Flahive released The Canoe Maker: David Moses Bridges, Passamaquoddy Birch Bark Artisan through Custom Museum Publishing LLC.

A scholarship has been named after Bridges, the David Moses Bridges Scholarship, which is granted by the First Peoples Fund. The David Moses Bridges scholarship was provided though the Main Community Foundation that supports the First People Fund Cultural.

References

External links 

 

1962 births
2017 deaths
Passamaquoddy people
Native American environmentalists
Activists from Portland, Maine
Native American basket weavers
Artists from Portland, Maine
20th-century American artists
20th-century American male artists
21st-century American artists
21st-century American male artists